Vorawan Chitavanich (Thai: วรวรรณ ชิตะวณิช) is a former midfielder who played for Thailand national team and was one of a few Thai players who played in Europe.

Managerial career

Tampines Rovers
Vorawan Chitavanich managed Tampines Rovers and achieved the S.League and Singapore Cup double in 2004. The following season, the Stags successfully defended their S.League title, were named the 'S.League Team of the Decade' and became the first Singaporean team to win the ASEAN Club Championship. They won Singapore Cup in 2006, but finished runners-up to SAFFC in the S.League.

Honours

Manager
Tampines Rovers
 S.League (2): 2004, 2005
 Singapore Cup (2): 2004, 2006
 ASEAN Club Championship (1): 2005

References

External links
S League

Vorawan Chitavanich
1961 births
Living people
Vorawan Chitavanich
Vorawan Chitavanich
Tampines Rovers FC head coaches
Singapore Premier League head coaches
Sembawang Rangers FC head coaches
Footballers at the 1990 Asian Games
Vorawan Chitavanich
Vorawan Chitavanich
Vorawan Chitavanich
Southeast Asian Games medalists in football
Association football midfielders
Competitors at the 1979 Southeast Asian Games
Vorawan Chitavanich
Thai expatriate sportspeople in Japan
Thai expatriate sportspeople in Denmark
Viborg FF players
Vorawan Chitavanich
Frederikshavn fI players
Vorawan Chitavanich